Haim is a Hebrew name.

Haim or L'Chaim may also refer to:
Hayim Association, an Israeli non-profit organisation supporting children with cancer
Haim (band), an American pop rock band
Haims, a commune in the Vienne department in France
L'Chaim Vodka, a line of kosher alcoholic beverages
L'Chaim Society, University of Oxford

See also
 Heim (disambiguation)
 Heym